Johor FM is a Johor-state Malay language radio station operated by Radio Televisyen Malaysia out of the Johor state capital Johor Bahru in Malaysia. It features local news and Malaysian music, 18-hours a day from 06:00 to 00:00 MST. Johor FM was one of the first regional radio stations in Malaysia.

Etymology 
The radio was formerly known as Radio Malaysia Johor and Radio 3 Johor Bahru.

History 
 7 November 1963 - Stesen Johor Bahru went on air for the first time on AM.
 4 June 1966 - Radio Malaysia Johor Bahru was officially inaugurated by the 23rd Sultan of Johor's, Sultan Ismail Al-Khalidi Ibni Ibrahim Al-Masyhur.
 30 August 1988 - Radio Malaysia Johor Bahru went FM stereo.
 20 October 1988 - Radio Malaysia Johor Bahru was split into 2-radio stations: its FM stereo radio transmitter was taken over by a new station called FM Stereo Johor Bahru (FMJB) which exclusively transmitted in South Johor and Singapore. Radio Malaysia Johor Bahru (RMJB) went back to the old AM 828 kHz.
 31 August 1989 - Radio Malaysia Johor Bahru changed its name to Radio 3 Johor Bahru.
 1 January 1991 - Radio 3 Johor Bahru returned to FM.
 1 January 1993 - Radio 3 Johor Bahru started broadcasting 18 hours a day from 06:00 to 00:00 MST.
 1 January 1994 - Radio 3 Johor Bahru and its complement station FM Stereo Johor Bahru (107.5 MHz) moved to the brand new Kompleks Penyiaran Sultan Iskandar (Sultan Iskandar Broadcasting Complex).
 31 August 1998 - Radio 3 Johor Bahru changed its name to Radio Malaysia Johor (RMJ).
 2 June 2005 - Radio Malaysia Johor came to be known by its current name Johor FM.
 September 2006 - The Radio Televisyen Malaysia 317-metre high transmitting mast at the Johor Bahru station was dismantled.
 March 2011 - FM Stereo Johor Bahru ceased broadcasts. Its frequency (107.5 MHz) became the frequency of Bernama Radio in Johor which started official transmission in January 2012 after test transmission on 27 December 2011.

Frequency

References

External links 
 
 

2005 establishments in Malaysia
Radio stations established in 2005
Radio stations in Malaysia
Malay-language radio stations
Mass media in Johor Bahru
Radio Televisyen Malaysia